Huberta (minor planet designation: 260 Huberta) is a large asteroid orbiting near the outer edge of the Main belt. It is dark and rich in carbon.

It belongs to the Cybele group of asteroids and may have been trapped in a 4:7 orbital resonance with Jupiter.

It was discovered by Johann Palisa on 3 October 1886 in Vienna and was named after Saint Hubertus.

References 

The Asteroid Orbital Elements Database
Minor Planet Discovery Circumstances
Asteroid Lightcurve Data File

External links
 
 

Cybele asteroids
Huberta
Huberta
CX:-type asteroids (Tholen)
18861003